Coverham Abbey, North Yorkshire, England, was a Premonstratensian monastery that was founded at Swainby in 1190 by Helewisia, daughter of the Chief Justiciar Ranulf de Glanville. It was refounded at Coverham in about 1212 by her son Ranulf fitzRalph, who had the body of his late mother reinterred in the chapter house at Coverham.

There is some evidence that the during the first half of the 14th century the abbey and its holdings were attacked by the Scots, with the abbey itself being virtually destroyed. Later in that century there is a record of there being fifteen canons plus the abbot in residence.

The abbey ruins are a Scheduled Ancient Monument and a Grade I listed building.

Swainby Abbey

Swainby Abbey was a Premonstratensian abbey in North Yorkshire, England.  It was founded in 1187 or 1188 by Helewise, the daughter of Ranulph de Glanville, Sheriff of Yorkshire and later Justiciar for King Henry II. She was the wife of Robert, Lord of Middleham. In 1195, Helewise was buried at the abbey. The monastery was moved to Coverham in 1202.

Dissolution and remains 
In the years leading up to dissolution, Coverham Abbey had been reduced to a modest size with fewer than a dozen monks, whose lands and comforts were managed by their monastic bailiff, Edward Loftus, father of the future Archbishop Adam Loftus.  Early in 1536, the King’s receiver William Blytheman, assisted by the Abbey's last seneschal Thomas Wraye, sent inspectors to the Abbey to search for misdemeanours, record rents and compile an inventory of possessions, no doubt ably assisted by Loftus.  By April, the Abbot was granted a pension, the monks offered the chance recant their vows and the monastery was stripped of all value, including “781 oz. of silver plate and 3 oz. Gold” included 6 brass bells and all the lead stripped from the roofs.  What was left was sold to Humphrey Orme twenty years later and rapidly fell into ruin.

The principal surviving remains include the ruins of the church and the guesthouse, which was incorporated into a house built on the site in 1674. This was replaced in the late 18th century by the current building known as Coverham Abbey House but still retains the surviving monastic features. The original gatehouse partially survives and there are many sculptural remains preserved including several tomb covers some with effigies of knights, from the 14th century.

The site is usually inaccessible to the public but can be glimpsed from the churchyard of Coverham's redundant medieval parish church, Holy Trinity Church, Coverham.

The exterior of the abbey and its grounds doubled as the home of Mrs Bond in two early episodes of the BBC television series All Creatures Great and Small.

Burials 
Geoffrey le Scrope (1285–1340) and his wife Ivetta De Ros
Ralph Neville, 1st Baron Neville de Raby
Ranulph Neville, 1st Baron Neville

References and notes

Notes

Sources 
 'Premonstratensian houses: Abbey of Coverham', A History of the County of York: Volume 3 (1974), pp. 243–45.
 Anthony New. 'A Guide to the Abbeys of England And Wales', p123-25. Constable.

External links 

Monasteries in North Yorkshire
1536 disestablishments in England
Premonstratensian monasteries in England
1190 establishments in England
Christian monasteries established in the 12th century
Coverdale (dale)
Scheduled monuments in North Yorkshire
Grade I listed buildings in North Yorkshire